Gorokan is a suburb of the Central Coast region of New South Wales, Australia. It is part of the  local government area. The word "Gorokan" means "The Morning Dawn" from the language of the Awabakal (an Aboriginal tribe). There are two schools in the area, Gorokan Public School and Gorokan High School. Electricity was first brought to the area as a part of a £42,000 programme for electricity reticulation under the Brisbane Water County Council.
Located on the shores of Lake Tuggerah, Gorokan has long been a holiday destination with the Quoy family first buying land in the area in 1923 where they built and rented a series of holiday homes. Other families such as the Gedlings (by way of Gordon and Margaret Gedling) built a holiday house on the Gorokan waterfront in 1956.

References

2. Newcastle Morning Herald and Miners' Advocate (NSW : 1876 – 1954) Thursday 25 April 1935 p 6 Article (http://nla.gov.au/nla.news-article139257202?)

3. The Gosford Times and Wyong District Advocate (NSW : 1906 – 1954) Friday 14 October 1949 p 1 Article (http://nla.gov.au/nla.news-article167109296?)

4. Anthony Scott, CSIRO Land and Water, Canberra Technical Report 40/98 December 1998 "The Ecology of the Tuggerah Lakes An Oral History" p 9
(http://www.clw.csiro.au/publications/technical98/tr40-98.pdf)

Suburbs of the Central Coast (New South Wales)